James Thie (born 27 June 1978) is a Welsh middle-distance runner specialising in the 1500 metres. He finished fourth at the 2004 World Indoor Championships.

Competition record

Personal best
Outdoor
1500 metres – 3:37.06 (Iráklio 2004)
One mile – 3:57.86 (London 2004)
2000 metres – 5:12.90 (Merksem 2004)
3000 metres – 8:04.67 (Berlin 2006)
Indoor
800 metres – 1:49.87 (Manchester 2003)
1500 metres – 3:38.69 (Birmingham 2004)
One mile – 3:57.71 (New York 2003)
2000 metres – 5:13.97 (Birmingham 1999)
3000 metres – 7:56.22 (Glasgow 2006)

References

1978 births
Living people
Welsh male middle-distance runners
Commonwealth Games competitors for Wales
Athletes (track and field) at the 2006 Commonwealth Games
Athletes (track and field) at the 2010 Commonwealth Games
Place of birth missing (living people)